Antoine Louis Moeldner (born December 12, 1891) was a pianist and piano teacher who worked in Boston.

Biography
Moeldner was born in Boston. He attended Volkmann School in Boston and graduated from Harvard College in 1913. He studied piano with Helen Hopekirk and Ignacy Jan Paderewski. One of his best-known students is Dianne Goolkasian Rahbee, who is an internationally known pianist and composer.

References

American music educators
American pianists
Harvard College alumni
1891 births
Year of death missing
People from Boston